The 1999–00 Meistriliiga season was the tenth season of the Meistriliiga, the top level of ice hockey in Estonia. Four teams participated in the league, and Tartu Valk 494 won the championship.

Standings

External links
Season on hockeyarchives.info

Meistriliiga
Meist
Meistriliiga (ice hockey) seasons